Grevillea leiophylla, commonly known as wallum grevillea, or dwarf spider oak, is a species of flowering plant in the family Proteaceae and is endemic to Queensland. It is a weakly erect to low-lying shrub with narrowly oblong to egg-shaped or more or less linear leaves, and clusters of pale to deep pink flowers.

Description

Taxonomy
Grevillea leiophylla was first formally described in 1870 by George Bentham in Flora Australiensis from an unpublished manuscript by Ferdinand von Mueller. The specific epithet (leiophylla) means "smooth-leaved".

Distribution and habitat
Wallum grevillea grows in shrubby woodland, forest, wallum or grassland in south-eastern Queensland, possibly as far north as Yeppoon.

See also
 List of Grevillea species

References

leiophylla
Flora of Queensland
Proteales of Australia
Taxa named by George Bentham
Plants described in 1870